Elian Memcaj (born 6 March 2002) is an Albanian professional basketball player who currently plays for KB Vllaznia in the Albanian Albanian Basketball League. He has also represented the Albania U18 national team.

References

External links
Profile at Eurobasket.com

2002 births
Living people
People from Shkodër County
People from Shkodër
Albanian men's basketball players
Basketball players from Shkodër
Sportspeople from Shkodër
Shooting guards